

Season-by-season
The table below chronicles the achievements of Rah Ahan F.C. every season, from 1968 to the present day.

Reserves 

The table below shows the achievements of the club's reserve team in various competitions.

References
	 	
Iran Premier League Stats	 	
RSSSF database about Iranian league football.		
Persian League

Rah Ahan